Several fields of human cultural and scientific development are not included in the list of Nobel Prizes, because they are neither among the prizes established as part of Alfred Nobel's will nor, in the case of the Nobel Memorial Prize in Economic Sciences, sponsored afterwards by the Nobel Foundation. While the foundation has discouraged (and occasionally taken legal action against) individuals and organizations that have used the Nobel name to refer to prizes not meeting the aforementioned criteria, several prominent individuals and organizations have nonetheless used the label "Nobel Prize of X" to refer to highly prestigious awards in fields of activity not covered by the official Nobel Prizes. These awards are listed below.

Prizes sponsored by the Nobel Foundation 
Alfred Nobel's last will of 1895 only included five prizes, covering outstanding achievements who confer the "greatest benefit on mankind" in the fields of chemistry, physics, literature, peace, and physiology or medicine. The original Nobel prizes thus includes:
 Nobel Prize in Chemistry
 Nobel Prize in Physics
 Nobel Prize in Literature
 Nobel Peace Prize
 Nobel Prize in Physiology or Medicine

In addition to the prizes listed above, the Nobel Memorial Prize in Economic Sciences is sponsored by the Nobel Foundation. The foundation has trademarked the term "Nobel Prize" and this designation cannot be legally used to refer to any prizes other than the five original Nobels.

Prizes not sponsored by the Nobel Foundation 
Several prizes in fields of study and achievement not covered by the original Nobel Prizes have been established by various entities. Some have been referred to as the "Nobel Prize of" that particular field, in the vast majority of cases without the approval of the Nobel Foundation. These prizes are generally the highest awards in their fields. For some fields, more than one prestigious prizes are listed below. Some most important prizes in the world are presented in bold. The distinguished prizes not conferred by the Nobel Foundation include (with the year when a prize was first awarded in brackets):

Mathematical sciences, physical sciences and applied sciences

Applied mathematics
 John von Neumann Lecture Prize (1960)
 Carl Friedrich Gauss Prize (2006)1
 George David Birkhoff Prize (1968)2
 Norbert Wiener Prize (1970)2

See also 'Mathematics' and 'Operations research' below.

Astronomy
 Kavli Prize in Astrophysics (2008)
 Gruber Prize in Cosmology (2000)
 Crafoord Prize in Astronomy (1985)
 Shaw Prize in Astronomy (2004)

Automation/control/cybernetics
 IEEE Control Systems Award (1982)  
 Giorgio Quazza Medal (1981)  
 Hendrik W. Bode Lecture Prize (1989)  
 Richard E. Bellman Control Heritage Award (1979)

Communications
 Marconi Prize (1975)
 IEEE Alexander Graham Bell Medal (1976)

Computer science
 Turing Award (1966)
 IEEE John von Neumann Medal (1992)
 Computer Pioneer Award (1981)1
 IMU Abacus Medal (1982)2

Electrical engineering
 IEEE Medal of Honor (1917)
 Faraday Medal (1922)
 Edison Medal (1909)

Energy research
 ENI Award (2008)
 Fermi Award (1956)
 Global Energy Prize

Engineering
 Charles Stark Draper Prize (1989)
 John Fritz Medal (1902)
 Queen Elizabeth Prize for Engineering (2013)

Information technology
 W. Wallace McDowell Award (1966)
 C&C Prize (1985)
 Mountbatten Medal (1992)

Information theory
 Claude E. Shannon Award (1972)
 IEEE Richard W. Hamming Medal (1988)

Materials research
  (1976)
 MRS Medal (1990)

Mathematics
 Abel Prize (2003)
 Fields Medal (1936)1
 Chern Medal (2010)2
 Wolf Prize in Mathematics (1978)3

See also 'Applied mathematics' above and 'Operations research' and 'Statistics' below.

Mechanical engineering
 ASME Medal (1921)
 Timoshenko Medal (1957)
 James Watt International Gold Medal (1937)

Nanoscience
 Kavli Prize in Nanoscience (2008)
 Feynman Prize in Nanotechnology (1993)

Operations research
 John von Neumann Theory Prize (1975)

Optics/photonics
 Frederic Ives Medal/Jarus W. Quinn Prize (1929)
 IEEE Photonics Award (2004)
 SPIE Gold Medal (1977)

Quantum information science
  (1996)
 Micius Quantum Prize (2018)
 Rolf Landauer and Charles H. Bennett Award in Quantum Computing (2017)1

Robotics
  Joseph F. Engelberger Robotics Award (1977)
 IEEE Robotics and Automation Award (2004)

Statistics
 Rousseeuw Prize for Statistics (2022) 
 International Prize in Statistics (2017)
 COPSS Presidents' Award (1981)1

Technology
 Millennium Technology Prize (2004)
There are two other technology awards also sometimes referred to as a "Nobel":
 Lemelson–MIT Prize (1995), which is dubbed as the "Nobel Prize of inventing" or "Oscar for inventors", awarded to outstanding mid-career inventors who are U.S. citizens or permanent residents, and have received a bachelor's degree within 25 years, as well as Lemelson-MIT Lifetime Achievement Award (awarded from 1995 to 2006), which recognized distinguished inventors whose pioneering spirit and inventiveness throughout their careers improved society and inspired others
 Honda Prize (1980), an international award that acknowledges the efforts of an individual or group who contribute new ideas which may lead the next generation in the field of ecotechnology, sometimes referred to as the "Nobel Prize in technology" since it has put a spotlight on achievements in a variety of fields based on a wide perspective in the future, including two Turing-awarded artificial intelligence accomplishments

Biological sciences, cognitive sciences and health sciences

Bioengineering
 Russ Prize (2001)
 Robert A. Pritzker Distinguished Lecture Award (1991)

Biology/ecology
 Crafoord Prize in Biosciences (1984)

Biomedicine
 Lasker Award (1946)
 Canada Gairdner Award (1959)
 Wolf Prize in Medicine (1978)

Cognitive science
 Rumelhart Prize
 Jean Nicod Prize recognizes top research in philosophically oriented cognitive sciences and the philosophy of mind.

Conservation biology
 Indianapolis Prize (2006)
 BBVA Foundation Frontiers of Knowledge Award in Ecology and Conservation Biology (2008)

Dentistry/oral sciences
 IADR Gold Medal (2018)
 IADR Distinguished Scientist Award (1960)

Environmental epidemiology
 John Goldsmith Award

Neuroscience
 Brain Prize

Nursing
 Florence Nightingale Medal

Optometry
 Glenn A. Fry Award

Pharmaceutical research
 Prix Galien Award

Psychology
 Grawemeyer Award (2001)
 Kurt-Koffka Medal (2008)

Geosciences, agricultural sciences and environmental sciences

Agriculture
 Wolf Prize in Agriculture (1978)
 World Food Prize (1987)
 Bertebos Prize (1997)

Atmospheric science
 Carl-Gustaf Rossby Research Medal (1951)

Earth science 
 Crafoord Prize in Geosciences (1983)

Environmental science
 Blue Planet Prize (1992)
 Tyler Prize for Environmental Achievement (1974)

Forestry
 Marcus Wallenberg Prize

Geography
 Vautrin Lud Prize (1991)
 Vega Medal (1881)1

Geology
 Vetlesen Prize (1960)
 Wollaston Medal (1831)
 Penrose Medal (1927)

Hydrology
 International Hydrology Prize (1981)
 Robert E. Horton Medal (1976)

Limnology
 Naumann-Thienemann Medal (1930)

Meteorology
 International Meteorological Organization Prize

Oceanography
 A.G. Huntsman Award for Excellence in the Marine Sciences
 Alexander Agassiz Medal (1913)

Soil science
 Dokuchaev Award

Sustainability
 Katerva Award

There are two other environmental awards often referred to as a "Nobel":
 Goldman Environmental Prize (1990) for environmental activism, often referred to as the "Green Nobel"
 Stockholm Water Prize (1991) for water-related achievements, known as the "Nobel Prize of water"

Social sciences and disciplines, business, humanities, and the arts

Anthropology
 Huxley Memorial Medal and Lecture (1900)
 The Swedish Society for Anthropology and Geography (SSAG), whose highest patron is the King of Sweden, awards a Gold Medal (called Retzius Medal before 2015) to world-leading scholars in anthropology and human geography.

Architecture
 Pritzker Prize (1979)
See also 'Arts' below.

Arts
 Praemium Imperiale, includes award categories in painting, sculpture, architecture, music, and a single film and theatre category.
 Wolf Prize in Arts (1981)
See also 'Architecture' and 'Nobel Prize in Literature' above, and 'Design', 'Music', and 'Photography' below.

Criminology
 Stockholm Prize in Criminology

Design
 Red Dot Design Award

Economics
 Nobel Memorial Prize in Economic Sciences (1969)
 John Bates Clark Medal (1947)1
 Erwin Plein Nemmers Prize in Economics (1994)
 John von Neumann Award (1995)2

Education
 Karolinska Prize for Research in Medical Education (2004)
 WISE Prize
 Yidan Prize is the world's most prestigious award in educational research.

Film
 Academy Awards (1929)
See 'Arts' above.

Finance
 Deutsche Bank Prize in Financial Economics (2005)
 IAQF Financial Engineer of the Year (1993)
 Fischer Black Prize (2003)1

Geography
 Vautrin Lud Prize (1991)
 The Swedish Society for Anthropology and Geography (SSAG), whose highest patron is the King of Sweden, awards a Gold Medal (called Retzius Medal before 2015) to world-leading scholars in human geography and anthropology.
See the section on Geosciences, Agricultural Sciences and Environmental Sciences awards above for prizes focused exclusively on physical geography.

Human rights
 Martin Ennals Award

Humanities
 Kluge Prize

Journalism
 Pulitzer Prize

Music/musicology
 Ernst von Siemens Music Prize (1972)
 Polar Music Prize (1989)
See also 'Arts' above.

Painting
See 'Arts' above.

Philosophy
 Berggruen Philosophy Prize (2016)
 Rolf Schock Prize
 Jean Nicod Prize recognizes top research in the philosophy of mind and philosophically oriented cognitive sciences.

Photography
 Hasselblad Award

Political science
 Johan Skytte Prize in Political Science (1995)

Public service/public administration
 United Nations Public Service Awards

Records and Information Management
 Emmett Leahy Award (1967)1

Sculpture
See 'Arts' above.

Social sciences/sociology
 Holberg Prize (2003)
 Nobel Memorial Prize in Economic Sciences1

Theatre
See 'Arts' above.

Tourism
 UNWTO Ulysses Prize (2003)

Urbanism
 Lee Kuan Yew World City Prize (2010)

Other fields

Religion
 Templeton Prize (1973)

Sports
 Laureus World Sports Awards

See also 
 Ig Nobel Prize (1991), a satiric prize to celebrate ten unusual or trivial achievements in scientific research every year
 Right Livelihood Award (1980), which recognizes contributions to solving global problems, oftentimes called "Alternative Nobel Prize" and understood as a critique of the traditional Nobel prizes
 Japan Prize (1985), which recognizes outstanding achievements in applied science (as opposed to the Nobel prizes, which tend to focus on basic science), selecting two fields for the prize according to current trends in science and technology
 Kyoto Prize (1985), which was created in collaboration with the Nobel Foundation and is regarded by many as Japan's version of the Nobel Prizes, representing one of the most prestigious awards available in fields that are not traditionally honored with a Nobel, consisting of three different categories: advanced technology, basic sciences, and arts and philosophy 
 Crafoord Prize (1982), whose laureates are selected by Swedish Royal Academies, who are also responsible for the selection of Nobel Prize laureates in physics, chemistry, literature, and economics, recognizing outstanding achievements in four disciplines to complement the Nobel (namely, astronomy and mathematics; geosciences; biosciences, with particular emphasis on ecology; and polyarthritis research), of which only one prize is awarded each year on a rotating basis by discipline, and the prize in polyarthritis is awarded only when substantial progress in the field has been made
 Rolf Schock Prizes (1993), which are awarded every three years also by Swedish Royal Academies, including four prizes in the fields of logic and philosophy, mathematics, the visual arts, and music
 Heineken Prizes (1964), which are awarded every two years by Royal Netherlands Academy of Arts and Sciences, including six prizes in the fields of biophysics and biochemistry (1964), art (1988), medicine (1989), history (1990), environmental science (1990), and cognitive science (2006)
 Wolf Prize (1978), which is considered second in importance to the Nobel Prize (but considered first in importance for the fields that doesn't have a Nobel Prize), with more than a third of recipients going on to win the Nobel, recognizing outstanding achievements in medicine, agriculture, mathematics, chemistry, physics, and arts
 Harvey Prize (1972), which is another prestigious Israeli award, with more than a quarter of recipients going on to win the Nobel (while recipients of the Nobel or Wolf Prizes are generally not eligible for the Harvey Prize, unless the accomplishments cited in the nomination represent new or different work), recognizing breakthroughs in science and technology, as well as contributions to peace in the Middle East
 Bower Awards (1990), conferred by the Franklin Institute, including the Bower Award and Prize for Achievement in Science, which recognizes significant contributions in a prescribed discipline that changes each year, and the Bower Award for Business Leadership, which recognizes individuals who have demonstrated outstanding leadership in an American business or industry 
 Benjamin Franklin Medal (1998), which recognizes outstanding contributions in seven disciplines of science and engineering (namely, chemistry; civil and mechanical engineering; computer and cognitive science; earth and environmental science; electrical engineering; life science; and physics), created in 1998 by reorganizing all of the endowed medals presented by the Franklin Institute at that time, including the Franklin Medal presented from 1915 until 1997, the Elliott Cresson Medal presented from 1875 until 1997, and other Franklin Institute medals presented since 1824, which have long been recognized as the oldest, and most comprehensive science and technology honor bestowed in the United States and around the world
 Copley Medal (1731), conferred by the Royal Society, thought to be the world's oldest science prize, pre-dating the Nobel Prize by 170 years, and now alternating between the physical sciences (including mathematics, chemistry, astronomy, geology) and the biological sciences (odd and even years respectively)
 Feltrinelli Prize (1950), conferred by the Accademia Nazionale dei Lincei, the world's oldest existing Academy of Sciences, annually awarding an International Prize, which rotates around five categories (namely, humanities; physical, mathematical and natural sciences; literature; arts; medicine), as well as a possible special international prize for an exceptional enterprise of high moral and humanitarian value; four National Prizes whose fields vary each year; and four additional national prizes entitled "Antonio Feltrinelli Giovani" to Italian scholars under 40 years of age, as well as another possible Antonio Feltrinelli Giovani one to a foreigner who has established a collaboration with an Italian scientific institution for at least 24 months
 Lomonosov Gold Medal (1959), conferred by the USSR Academy of Sciences and later the Russian Academy of Sciences, annually awarding two medals, one to a domestic scientist and one to a foreigner for outstanding achievements in the natural sciences as well as the humanities, an award similar to which conferred by the National Academy of Sciences of Ukraine is the Vernadsky Gold Medal (2003)
 Grande Médaille (1997), conferred by the French Academy of Sciences, to an international distinguished researcher in a different field each year, created in 1997 by combining more than 100 historic foundation prizes, such as Lalande-Valz Prize (Lalande Prize, 1803–1970; Valz Prize, 1877–1970; Lalande-Valz Prize, 1970–1996) and Poincaré Medal (1914-1996)
 Max Planck-Humboldt Research Award (2018), succeeding the Max Planck Research Award for International Cooperation (1990-2004) and the Max Planck Research Award (2004-2017), annually awarded to an internationally renowned mid-career researcher with outstanding future potential from outside Germany but having a strong interest in a research residency in Germany for limited time periods, alternately in the fields of natural and engineering sciences, human sciences, and life sciences, as well as the Max Planck-Humboldt Medal (2018) awarded to other two finalists
 Breakthrough Prize (2013), the world's most generous science prize, known as the "Oscars of Science", recognizing outstanding achievements in three categories: life sciences, fundamental physics, and mathematics 
 Kavli Prize (2008), which recognizes scientists for their seminal advances in three research areas: astrophysics, nanoscience, and neuroscience, awarded every second year
 Gruber Prizes (2000), whose International Prize Program honors scientists in the fields of cosmology (2000), genetics (2001), and neuroscience (2004) for their groundbreaking work providing new models that inspire and enable fundamental shifts in knowledge and culture; and whose two other previous prizes for justice (2001-2011) and women's rights (2003-2011) have merged and transitioned into the Gruber Program for Global Justice and Women's Rights
 Shaw Prize (2004), which is described as the "Nobel of the East" or "Nobel Prize of Asia", recognizing outstanding contributions in three categories: astronomy, life science and medicine, and mathematical sciences
 Tang Prize (2014), which is also considered as an Asian Nobel, recognizing outstanding contributions in four categories: sustainable development, biopharmaceutical science, sinology, and rule of law 
 Ramon Magsaysay Award (1958), which is also considered as the Nobel Prize counterpart of Asia, awarded exclusively to Asian individuals and organizations for their outstanding contributions in six categories (namely, government service; public service; community leadership; journalism, literature and creative communication arts; peace and international understanding; and emergent leadership), the first five of which have been succeeded by an uncategorized one since 2009, celebrating greatness of spirit and transformative leadership in Asia
 King Faisal Prize (1979), which recognizes outstanding contributions in five categories (namely, service to Islam; Islamic studies; Arabic language and literature; medicine; and science), the first three of which are widely considered as the most prestigious awards in the Muslim world, and more than 20 laureates of the other two in science and medicine have won the Nobel
 Mustafa Prize (2015), which is dubbed the "Islamic Nobel Prize" for science and technology, and is awarded to the scientists working in the member states of the Organisation of Islamic Cooperation for outstanding contributions in three selected categories (namely, information and communication science and technology; life and medical science and technology; and nanoscience and nanotechnology), regardless of his/her religion; and also awarded to best Muslim scientists all over the world in all areas of science and technology, regardless of his/her nationality
 Infosys Prize (2008), which could be called the Nobel Prize of India, recognizing outstanding contributions in six categories: mathematical sciences (2008), physical sciences (2009), life sciences (2009), social sciences (2009), engineering and computer science (2010), and humanities (2012), awarded to researchers under 50 years of age, in a preference order to ones of Indian residents (Indian citizens and non-Indians who have been residing in India for at least three years), ones of Indian origin, and ones of any nationality or origin, resident and working anywhere, who has done world class work in their field
 Princess of Asturias Awards (1981), formerly the Prince of Asturias Awards from 1981 to 2014, seen as the Spain's version of the Nobel Prizes or the Hispanic world's Nobel, recognizing notable achievements in sciences, humanities, and public affairs, consisting of eight different categories: arts, social sciences, communication and humanities, concord (peace), international cooperation, sports, technical and scientific research, and literature
 BBVA Foundation Frontiers of Knowledge Awards (2008), which recognize significant contributions in eight categories: basic science (physics, chemistry, mathematics); biology and biomedicine; ecology and conservation biology; climate change; information and communications technologies; economics, finance and management; humanities and social sciences; music and opera
 WCC World Awards (1984), including the Albert Einstein World Award of Science (1984), the José Vasconcelos World Award of Education (1985), and the Leonardo da Vinci World Award of Arts (1989), which are awarded to outstanding scientists, educators, and artists, respectively, and the first one is awarded annually and the other two alternate in even and odd years respectively
 Dan David Prize (2002), which annually awards three prizes whose fields vary each year and are chosen within the three time dimensions - Past, Present and Future, for achievements having an outstanding scientific, technological, cultural or social impact on our world
 Balzan Prize (1961), which annually awards four prizes chosen from two categories (namely,  literature, moral sciences and the arts; and physical, mathematical and natural sciences and medicine), two per category, whose fields vary each year; and also awards a prize for humanity, peace and fraternity among peoples every three to seven years
 Heinz Awards (1995), which annually award five prizes in the fields of arts and humanities; environment; human condition; public policy; and technology, the economy and employment; and in certain years also award the Chairman's Medal to honor the lifetime achievement of a particular individual
 Grawemeyer Award (1985), which pays tribute to the power of creative ideas, emphasizing the impact a single idea can have on the world, rather than a lifetime of accomplishment, honoring individuals in the fields of music composition (1985), ideas improving world order (1988), education (1989), religion (1990), and psychology (2001)

References 

Nobel of a field
Known As